The Quest is an American action/adventure television series that aired on ABC from October to November 1982. The series stars Perry King, Noah Beery Jr., Karen Austin, and Ray Vitte as potential heirs to the throne of a fictional European monarchy that, were its king to die without issue, would revert to rule by France.

Produced by Stephen J. Cannell, the series was canceled after five episodes.

Cast
 Perry King as Dan Underwood
 Noah Beery Jr. as Art Henley
 Ray Vitte as Cody Johnson
 Karen Austin as Carrie Welby
 Michael Billington as Count Louis Dardinay
 John Rhys-Davies as Sir Edward
 Ralph Michael as King Charles

US television ratings
<onlyinclude>

Episodes

References

External links
 
 

1982 American television series debuts
1982 American television series endings
1980s American drama television series
American action television series
American Broadcasting Company original programming
English-language television shows
Television series by Stephen J. Cannell Productions
American action adventure television series
Television shows set in France